Brent Robert Gates (born March 14, 1970) is a former Major League Baseball second and third baseman. He played for the Oakland Athletics, Seattle Mariners, and Minnesota Twins between 1993 and 1999.

Playing career

Amateur
Gates attended Grandville High School in Grandville, Michigan, and the University of Minnesota, where he played for the Minnesota Golden Gophers baseball team. In 1991, Gates was named the Big Ten Conference Baseball Player of the Year, and was a member of the College Baseball All-America Team. After the 1991 season, he played collegiate summer baseball with the Hyannis Mets of the Cape Cod Baseball League.

Professional
Drafted by the Oakland Athletics in the first round of the 1991 Major League Baseball Draft, Gates made his major league debut with Oakland on May 5, 1993, and appeared in his final game on October 3, 1999.

Coaching and scouting career
Gates was head coach of the Grand Rapids Christian High School baseball team, leading them to two State Championships. and was a coach for the Class-A West Michigan Whitecaps during the 2001 season. He was the varsity baseball coach at Byron Center High School in Byron Center, Michigan through the 2018 season. Gates is based in Grand Rapids and is a professional scout for the Tampa Bay Rays.

References

External links

1970 births
Living people
All-American college baseball players
Baseball players from Grand Rapids, Michigan
Huntsville Stars players
Hyannis Harbor Hawks players
Madison Muskies players
Major League Baseball second basemen
Major League Baseball third basemen
Minnesota Golden Gophers baseball players
Minnesota Twins players
Modesto A's players
Oakland Athletics players
Seattle Mariners players
Southern Oregon A's players
Tacoma Rainiers players
Tacoma Tigers players
Tampa Bay Rays scouts
People from Grandville, Michigan